Tomi Lewis (born 17 January 1999) is a Welsh rugby union player who plays for the Jersey Reds as a Fullback and/or Winger. 
He has turned out for the Wales 7's and, more recently, Wales U20 in the 2019 U20 Six Nations.

Lewis joined the Jersey Reds for the 2022–2023 season.

References 

1999 births
Living people
Scarlets players
Rugby union fullbacks
Rugby union wings
Welsh rugby union players
Ampthill RUFC players
Rugby union players from Brecon
Jersey Reds players